Transnational is the ninth studio album by the German-based alternative electronic band VNV Nation, released on 11 October 2013 in Europe and on 19 November 2013 in America under Anachron Sounds.

It charted in the mainstream chart in Germany at no. 9 (2 weeks total), in Switzerland at no. 99 (1 week total) and in Belgium at no. 132 (1 week total).

Track listing

References 

VNV Nation albums
2013 albums